Eastern Samar (Waray-Waray: Sinirangan Samar), officially the Province of Eastern Samar, is a province in the Philippines located in the Eastern Visayas region. Its capital is the city of Borongan. Eastern Samar occupies the eastern portion of the island of Samar. Bordering the province to the north is the province of Northern Samar and to the west is Samar province. To the east lies the Philippine Sea, part of the vast Pacific Ocean, while to the south lies Leyte Gulf.

History

Colonial period
During his circumnavigation of the globe, Ferdinand Magellan had set foot on the tiny island of Homonhon in the southern part of the province. On March 16, 1521, the area of what is now Eastern Samar is said to be the first Philippine landmass spotted by Magellan and his crew.

Philippine-American War 

Maj. Eugenio Daza Area Commander of General Lukbán's forces for Southeastern Samar

Balangiga Encounter

On September 28, 1901,  Filipino guerrillas led by Valeriano Abanador and Eugenio Daza in Balangiga ambushed American troops, killing 48 members of the US 9th Infantry. The incident triggered the infamous American retaliation March across Samar against the Samar populace and guerrillas.

World War II 
In 1944, combined Filipino-American troops involved in the liberation of the Philippines from Japan built in the town of Guiuan the largest military base in the Pacific. In the same town in 1949, approximately 5,000 Russian refugees escaping from communist China temporarily settled on Tubabao Island until 1951, when they were transferred to Australia and the United States.

Independent province
Eastern Samar, as a province, was created from Samar province through Republic Act No. 4221 on June 19, 1965. Congressmen Eladio T. Balite (1st Dist. Samar), Fernando R. Veloso (2nd Dist. Samar), and Felipe J. Abrigo (3rd Dist. Samar), authored Republic Act 4221 which was approved by Congress in 1963. The law, ratified in a plebiscite on June 19, 1965, divided Samar into three: Northern Samar, Eastern Samar and (Western) Samar.

Typhoon Haiyan (Yolanda), one of the strongest typhoons ever recorded, made its first landfall in the coastal town of Guiuan in November 2013.

Geography
Eastern Samar covers a total area of  occupying the eastern section and majority of southern Samar's coast of Samar island in the Eastern Visayas region. The province is bordered to the north by Northern Samar and to the west by Samar. To the east lies the Philippine Sea, part of the vast Pacific Ocean, while to the south lies Leyte Gulf.

Because it faces the Philippine Sea of the Pacific Ocean, Eastern Samar suffers heavily from powerful typhoons.

Administrative divisions
Eastern Samar comprises 22 municipalities and one city, all encompassed by a double legislative districts.

Demographics

The predominant language is Waray and it is the main lingua franca of the entire island of Samar.

In the 2000 Census, Warays comprised  of the total provincial population of 375,124 at that time.

Religion
The people of the province are devoted Christians where a majority adhere to Roman Catholicism. The dominant Catholic faith influences the events of the provincial education, politics and social functions of the people. Other Christians usually form the remaining groups of believers such as the Born-again Christians, Protestants, Iglesia Filipina Independiente or Aglipayan church, Jehova's Witnesses, Iglesia ni Cristo, Baptists, Methodists, The Church of Jesus Christ of Latter-day Saints, and Seventh-day Adventists. Non Christians (mostly Muslims) are also found.

Transportation
The province has one operational airport; Borongan Airport located in the capital city. Currently, only Leascor operates out of Borongan Airport with flights weekly to serve locals and tourists to and from Cebu.

By land, mini buses and vans ply from the regional center in Tacloban City, Catbalogan, and Calbayog in Samar province and to some towns in Eastern Samar. From Borongan, buses ply to Manila. Motorized boats plies through Leyte Gulf ferrying passengers going to Tacloban City seaport.

Economy

Commercial activities in the province are centered on the provincial capital of Borongan while tourism activities are centered in Guiuan town where Calicoan Island and the historical Homonhon Island are located. Generally, the province's major economic resource is fishery and agriculture which include production of coconut, copra, corn, rice, sugar, and vegetables. Tourism potential is untapped on the northern part of the province.

References

External links

 
 
 
 Philippine Standard Geographic Code
 Local Governance Performance Management System

 
Provinces of the Philippines
Provinces of Eastern Visayas
States and territories established in 1965
1965 establishments in the Philippines
Samar